Ives Bank is a submarine bank with a least depth of  in the Bellingshausen Sea. It was named by the UK Antarctic Place-Names Committee after Lieutenant Commander David M. Ives, Royal Navy, who surveyed this bank from HMS Endurance in March 1981.

References

Undersea banks of the Southern Ocean
Landforms of Graham Land
Landforms of Adelaide Island